is a 1931 Japanese comedy film directed by Heinosuke Gosho. It was Japan's first feature length film to fully employ sound.

Plot
The comedic story depicts a playwright attempting to write a play by a strict deadline and getting distracted by his family and a noisy next-door jazz band.

The film opens with Shibano, a playwright for a Tokyo theater, squabbling with a painter over his work depicting a local house, newly up for rent. The two stumble into the street only to be interrupted when Shibano accidentally falls into the women's section of a nearby bathhouse. The woman who appears to scold them ends up dissolving the situation, and Shibano finally states his desire to move into the house pictured previously.

Soon, Shibano and his family have moved in, but he is late on his deadline for a new script and the family is running low on money. His first attempts do not go well, with distractions from his children and his wife, as well as his own procrastination. The neighbors are also distracting, as they host the rehearsals of a jazz band. When Shibano goes next door to ask them to quiet down, he is invited by the wife of the household to stay and watch the rehearsal. She turns out to be the same woman who previously intervened in Shibano's fight in Tokyo. As the group practices and treats Shibano to drink, he listens to the song lyrics and becomes infected with the new jazz fever of the period. The song about the "Age of Speed" inspires him to go home and finish his script. The movie ends with a more modernized family reflecting on their differences from the local farmers.

Cast
 Atsushi Watanabe as Shibano Shinnsaku, the playwright
 Kinuyo Tanaka as Shibano's wife
 Satoko Date as Yamakawa Takiko, the neighbor's wife
 Mitsuko Ichimura as the playwright's daughter
 Shinichi Himori
 Yukiko Inoue
 Tokuji Kobayashi
 Takeshi Sakamoto

Awards
The Neighbor's Wife and Mine won the 1932 Kinema Junpo Award for Best Film.

References

External links

1931 films
1931 comedy films
Japanese comedy films
Japanese black-and-white films
Films directed by Heinosuke Gosho
Best Film Kinema Junpo Award winners